Antvorskov Barracks is a barracks located near Slagelse in Denmark. It was established in 1969 and currently houses the 2nd Brigade and the Guard Hussar Regiment including its mounted squadron. The latter was moved here from Næstved Kaserne in August 2003.

The building was constructed in a modernistic style.

2009 Robbery
On the night between January 3 and 4 2009, the garrison was robbed by three masked and armed men. The robbers escaped in a stolen car with weapons, including M/95 rifles and 45 M/96  carbines, and ammunition from the armory. After an initial investigation recovered some of the weapons, 19 M/95 and 45 M/96 carbines along with other 38 assorted small arms remained unaccounted for. On 22 November 2011 the police recovered the last of the stolen weapons.

References

Slagelse Municipality
Barracks in Denmark